Ivan Ivankov (Łacinka: Ivan Aliaksandravič Ivankoŭ; born April 10, 1975 in Minsk) is a retired Belarusian artistic gymnast. Ivankov; a very big name in the gymnastics world, which he earned throughout years of competition and hard work. The 1994 and 1997 all-around World Champion, and the 1994 and 1996 all-around European Champion, Ivankov has competed for over a decade on the international circuit. Despite his numerous achievements at the World Championships, Europeans and other events, Ivankov has suffered a string of misfortunes at the Olympics, and has never won an Olympic medal. He had to share a third place with another competitor, after which, the bronze Olympic medal wasn’t given to him.

Early life and career
Ivankov was born in Minsk, Belarus in 1975. He began gymnastics at the age of 6, and by the time he was 14, was a member of the Soviet national junior team, training at the prestigious Round Lake national gymnastics center.

Ivankov established himself as a top up-and-coming gymnast at the 1991 Junior European Championships in Greece, where he won the all-around, pommel horse, high bar, vault and rings titles, and earned a silver medal on floor.

Senior career

1992-1996
Following the breakup of the Soviet Union, Ivankov began representing Belarus. He competed at both the 1992 Junior European Championships, where he helped the Belarusian team to a gold medal finish, and the senior European Championships in Budapest, where he placed 13th in the all-around. He competed in his first World Championships in 1993, where he won a bronze medal on the rings.

1994 was Ivankov's breakout year. At the 1994 World Championships in Brisbane, he won the all-around gold, defeating reigning Olympic champion and teammate Vitaly Scherbo in the process. The same year, Ivankov won his first all-around senior European Championships title and placed well in other international competitions.

Competing on the vault in Brisbane, Ivankov suffered an injury to his Achilles tendon. The injury forced him to miss the 1995 World Championships in Sabae, but he recovered sufficiently to win his second European Championships in 1996 and was considered to be a major medal threat for the 1996 Olympics in Atlanta. However, after arriving in Atlanta, Ivankov's Achilles snapped as he was walking across a parking lot, ending his Olympic bid.

1997–2004
Ivankov's Achilles injury required serious rehabilitation, reconstructive surgery and muscle grafts, and months of physical therapy. His condition was considered to be career-ending, however, only a year after rupturing his Achilles, Ivankov returned to win his second all-around gold medal at the 1997 World Championships. One year later, he won the all-around at the Goodwill Games in New York City.

In 2000, Ivankov competed in the 2000 Olympics where he finished 4th in the all-around, and 5th in the individual parallel bars and still rings event finals.

In 2001, Ivankov led the Belarusian team to the gold medal at the World Championships in Ghent, Belgium. Individually he finished second all-around, just shy from an unprecedented third world all-around title.

Two years later, Belarus finished 13th at the World Championships in Anaheim, failing to qualify a full team to the 2004 Olympics in Athens. Ivankov competed in Athens as an individual.

After competing at the 2005 and 2006 World Championships, Ivankov decided to retire from international competition. He still performs in exhibitions worldwide.

Post-competitive work 
In recent years, Ivankov resided in Oklahoma and coached at the Bart Conner Gymnastics Academy. In 2009, he accepted a coaching job for the Illinois Fighting Illini men's gymnastics team. In 2012, he was awarded the National Assistant Coach of the Year award as the Fighting Illini won the 2012 NCAA Men's Gymnastics Championship. He owns a gym called Elite Gymnastics Academy in Massachusetts. As of 2019, he is also now a coach for Champions Gymnastics Academy in Katy, TX.

Personal life
In 2001, Ivankov married Suzyanna, an aerobics instructor and Belarusian television personality. They divorced in 2007, and he remarried the same year. In 2001, Ivankov was named godfather to Alexei Nemov's son.
Ivankov has a son, and is currently married to his second wife.

References

Video Interviews

1975 births
Living people
Gymnasts from Minsk
Belarusian male artistic gymnasts
World champion gymnasts
Medalists at the World Artistic Gymnastics Championships
Gymnasts at the 2000 Summer Olympics
Olympic gymnasts of Belarus
Gymnasts at the 2004 Summer Olympics
College men's gymnastics coaches in the United States
Illinois Fighting Illini men's gymnastics coaches
Universiade medalists in gymnastics
Universiade gold medalists for Belarus
Competitors at the 1998 Goodwill Games
European champions in gymnastics
20th-century Belarusian people
21st-century Belarusian people